THNK School of Creative Leadership is an international leadership organization headquartered in Amsterdam. The school was founded in 2010 with the purpose of developing creative leaders to "turn global challenges and crises into opportunities, the ultimate goal being to achieve a more meaningful and sustainable way of life."

The school offers two primary streams of learning — an Executive Leadership Program, a catalogue of creative leadership education programs, and custom-made programs for organizations. The school’s curriculum is aimed towards mid-career professionals from around the world, working across sectors, including the corporate sector, entrepreneurial sector, non-profit sector, and public sector. The school also has locations in Vancouver and Lisbon.

History
THNK was launched in 2010 as a public-private partnership supported by the Dutch government, the City of Amsterdam, the Province of North Holland, Vodafone, McKinsey & Company, KLM Airlines, and a host of other private and public entities. It was founded to establish Amsterdam as a creative center and boost the city’s innovation ecosystem. Partly funded by the City of Amsterdam, and influenced by the leadership thinking and creative modeling of companies such as McKinsey, Pixar, IDEO, and Philips, “THNK intentionally chose to stay outside of the formal education system so that it could create its own version of what leadership training for the 21st century should look like”.

The co-founders were Bas Verhart and Menno van Dijk. Stefano Marzano, former Chief Design Officer of Philips, was the Founding Dean of the new course.

THNK’s Advisory Board includes Creative Commons vice chair Esther Wojcicki, Dutch architect Ben van Berkel, former Managing Director of McKinsey & Company Dominic Barton, and designer Marcel Wanders.

Programs
Executive Leadership Program
Custom Programs: THNK works with different organizations on special programs. THNK has worked with FIFA to support and develop female leaders at the senior decision-making level in football, with Stanford University to deliver the mediaX Global Innovation Leadership program, and with the Dubai Future Academy to deliver an Executive Education Program.

Notable alumni
Anya Ayoung-Chee
Mark Brand
Princess Reema bint Bandar Al Saud
Easkey Britton
Wempy Dyocta Koto
Jon Gosier
Jürgen Griesbeck, Founder of Common Goal
Osher Günsberg
Rand Hindi
Hermen Hulst, Founder of Guerrilla Games 
Ellen Jorgensen
Katherine Maher, Executive Director at Wikimedia Foundation

References

External links 
 Official website

Business schools in the Netherlands
Education in Amsterdam